NGC 5559 is a barred spiral galaxy, located 240 million light-years away in the constellation of Boötes. It was discovered on April 10, 1785 by the astronomer William Herschel.

In 2001, a type Ib supernova was detected within NGC 5559, and was subsequently designated SN 2001co. The supernova was a calcium-rich supernova, as it had strong spectral lines characteristic of calcium. The progenitors of these calcium-rich supernovae are still a mystery.

See also
 Spiral galaxy

References

External links
 
 

Barred spiral galaxies
Boötes
5559
51155
9166